KMEI may refer to:

 KMEI-LP, a low-power radio station (97.3 FM) licensed to Kamiah, Idaho, United States
 the ICAO code for Meridian Regional Airport, in  Meridian, Mississippi, United States